The Ghost Comes Home is a 1940 American comedy film directed by Wilhelm Thiele and written by Richard Maibaum and Harry Ruskin. The film stars Frank Morgan, Billie Burke, Ann Rutherford, John Shelton, Reginald Owen and Donald Meek. The film was released on March 8, 1940, by Metro-Goldwyn-Mayer.

It was based on a play by Georg Kaiser which had previously been made into the 1935 German film The Valiant Navigator by Hans Deppe.

Plot
Pet store owner Vern Adams is going to catch a ship to help out his friend John Thomas, however he still has time before it ships, so Vern goes to a nightclub and ends up being arrested for 60 days. When he gets out he finds out that the ship sank and that his family is using the insurance money. Now Vern hides out, so his family is not arrested for fraud.

Cast 

 Frank Morgan as Vern Adams
 Billie Burke as Cora Adams
 Ann Rutherford as Billie Adams
 John Shelton as Lanny Shea
 Reginald Owen as Hemingway
 Donald Meek as Mortimer Hopkins, Sr.
 Nat Pendleton as Roscoe
 Frank Albertson as Ernest
 Harold Huber as Tony
 Hobart Cavanaugh as Ambrose Bundy
 Ann Morriss as Myra
 Don Castle as 'Spig'
 Tom Rutherford as Mortimer Hopkins, Jr.
 Renie Riano as Sarah Osborn
 Richard Carle as John Reed Thomas

References

External links 
 
 
 
 

1940 films
1940 comedy films
American comedy films
1940s English-language films
Films directed by Wilhelm Thiele
Films based on works by Georg Kaiser
American films based on plays
American remakes of German films
Metro-Goldwyn-Mayer films
American black-and-white films
Films with screenplays by Richard Maibaum
1940s American films